Carnarvonia is a genus of arthropods of uncertain affinities, known from the Middle Cambrian Burgess Shale. Its bivalved carapace bears the imprints of its veins.

References

External links 
 Carnarvonia venosa". Burgess Shale Fossil Gallery. Virtual Museum of Canada. 2011. (Burgess Shale species 35)

Fossil taxa described in 1912
Burgess Shale animals
Arthropod enigmatic taxa
Taxa named by Charles Doolittle Walcott